Ridgeland is a town in Jasper and Beaufort counties, South Carolina, United States. The population was 3,749 at the 2020 census, a 7.1% decrease from 2010. It has been the county seat of Jasper County since the county's formation in 1912. As defined by the U.S. Census Bureau, Ridgeland is included within the Hilton Head Island-Bluffton-Beaufort metropolitan area.

Ridgeland is home to the Ridgeland Correctional Institution, a medium-security prison operated by the South Carolina Department of Corrections.

Ridgeland was originally known as "Gopher Hill" in 1894, derived from the gopher tortoise, which is indigenous to the area. The name was not considered good enough for a new railroad station, so it was changed to "Ridgeland" in 1902 by the station ticket master, Frederick Henry Ingram, for the fact that the town stands on a sandy ridge that is some of the highest land in Jasper County.

Geography
The town limits now extend east into Beaufort County as far as the west bank of the Broad River.

Demographics

2020 census

As of the 2020 United States census, there were 3,758 people, 1,148 households, and 778 families residing in the town. The population density was 1,046.6 people per square mile (403.4/km2). There were 597 housing units at an average density of 248.1 per square mile (95.6/km2).

There were 1,148 households, out of which 33.8% had children under the age of 18 living with them, 35.2% were married couples living together, 22.1% had a female householder with no husband present, and 35.6% were non-families. 29.8% of all households were made up of individuals, and 14.5% had someone living alone who was 65 years of age or older. The average household size was 2.53 and the average family size was 3.02.

In the town, the population was spread out, with 14.9% under the age of 18, 16.6% from 18 to 24, 44.5% from 25 to 44, 15.8% from 45 to 64, and 8.2% who were 65 years of age or older. The median age was 33 years. For every 100 females, there were 279.8 males. For every 100 females age 18 and over, there were 338.2 males.  The presence of the Ridgeland Correctional Institution in the town limits heavily skews the sex ratio.

The median income for a household in the town was $31,991, and the median income for a family was $37,647. Males had a median income of $26,593 versus $14,641 for females. The per capita income for the town was $7,394. About 20.0% of families and 25.2% of the population were below the poverty line, including 32.7% of those under age 18 and 14.5% of those age 65 or over.

Education
Ridgeland is home to Ridgeland Elementary School and Ridgeland-Hardeeville High School.  Thomas Heyward Academy, which opened in 1970 as a segregation academy is located inside of the town limits.

Transportation

Roads
, the major north-south highway on the Eastern Seaboard, runs through Ridgeland. A trumpet interchange to a connecting road exists south of the town at Exit 18 north of Switzerland, though the main interchanges within the community are Exits 21 and 22.
, a principal route connecting Charleston, Savannah, and beyond, enters Ridgeland after passing through Switzerland. The road is known locally as Jacob Smart Boulevard and has an interchange with I-95 at Exit 22, which it joins in an overlap until Point South at Exit 33. The road is mainly four lanes wide, with some segments having a center turn lane, although it becomes a four-lane divided highway north of downtown Ridgeland before joining I-95 in the aforementioned overlap.
 overlaps US 17 from northern Hardeeville, before veering west onto Third Street and then Grays Highway towards Augusta, Georgia, and Atlanta.
, Ridgeland's Main Street, runs eastward from its starting point at U.S. 321 in Tillman. Within Ridgeland it intersects U.S. 17, goes under I-95 at Exit 21, and continues eastward towards the hamlet of Old House at SC 462.

Rail
The CSX Railway's Charleston Subdivision (also known as the Charleston-Savannah Railway) currently operates both freight trains and passenger trains (via Amtrak) along the lines, but do not stop at Ridgeland. The line runs along the west side of US 17 until the south end of the I-95 overlap, where it then runs along Nuna Rock Road (Old US 17) until it reaches Coosawhatchie.

Notable people
 Thomas Heyward, Jr., signer of the Declaration of Independence and Articles of Confederation
 LaRue Howard, gospel musician
 Reverend Ike (Frederick J. Eikerenkoetter II), popular and controversial prosperity theology televangelist
 General Lloyd W. Newton, first African-American pilot in the U.S. Air Force Thunderbirds
 General Jacob E. Smart, Cold War era U.S. Air Force general

References

External links

 Town of Ridgeland official website

Towns in Jasper County, South Carolina
Towns in South Carolina
County seats in South Carolina
Hilton Head Island–Beaufort micropolitan area